Shelley Jones (née Russell, born 15 July 1987) is a South African field hockey player who competed in the 2008 and 2012 Summer Olympics. She was also part of the 2014 Commonwealth Games team that reached the bronze medal match.

Her brother, Brent, were also South Africa rugby union internationals.

References

External links

1987 births
Living people
People from Sandton
South African people of British descent
South African female field hockey players
Olympic field hockey players of South Africa
Field hockey players at the 2008 Summer Olympics
Field hockey players at the 2012 Summer Olympics
Field hockey players at the 2014 Commonwealth Games
Commonwealth Games competitors for South Africa
Field hockey players at the 2018 Commonwealth Games
Female field hockey forwards
Sportspeople from Gauteng